Lego Technic  is a line of Lego interconnecting plastic rods and parts. The purpose of this series is to create more advanced models with more complex technical functions, compared to the simpler brick-building properties of normal Lego.

Overview
The concept was introduced as the Expert Builder series and originally Technical Sets in 1977, and was renamed Technic in 1982.

Technic sets are often characterized by the presence of special pieces, such as gears, axles, and pins. Other special pieces include beams and plates with holes in them, through which the axles could be installed. Some sets also come with pneumatic pieces or electric motors. In recent years, Technic pieces have begun filtering down into other Lego sets as well, including the BIONICLE sets (which were once sold as part of the Technic line), as well as a great many others.

The style of Lego Technic sets has been changing over time. Technic sets produced since the year 2000 use a different construction method, described as "studless construction". (Studs are the small circular knobs which appear on traditional Lego bricks.) This method utilises beams and pins rather than Technic bricks.

Mindstorms, a Lego line of robotic products, also uses many Technic pieces, although it is sold as a separate line of products. The latest generation of the Mindstorms range, the Robot Inventor (released October 2020), as well as its predecessors the Mindstorms EV3 (released September 2013) and the Mindstorms NXT (released August 2006), are based on the studless construction method.

In September 2021, Matthew Ashton, The Lego Group's Vice President of Design announced the Technic alongside City, Friends, Creator, Classic, Speed Champions, Monkie Kid, Ninjago, Collectible Minifigures and DOTS themes will continue until at least 2023.

Lego Technic components

The Lego Technic system expands on the normal Lego bricks with a whole range of new bricks that offer new function and building styles. The most significant change from normal Lego is that single-stud wide bricks ('beams') have circular holes through their vertical face. These holes can accommodate pins, which enable two beams to be held securely together side-by-side, or hinged at an angle. The holes also act as bearings for axles, on which gears and wheels can be attached to create complex mechanisms. 
Studless beams (studs are the bumps traditionally associated with Lego parts), referred to as 'liftarms', were first introduced in 1989 and through the 1990s and 2000s, an increasing number of liftarm designs have been introduced over time.

Gears
Gears have been included within Lego Technic sets since 1977 as a way of transferring rotary power, and of gearing-up or down the speed. Gears come in several sizes: 8 tooth, 16 tooth, 24 tooth and 40 tooth spur gears; 12 tooth, 20 tooth, 28 tooth and 36 tooth double bevel gears; and 12 tooth and 20 tooth single bevel gears. The double bevel gears are cut so they can also be meshed as spur gears. There is also a 16 tooth spur clutch gear, a 20 tooth double bevel clutch gear and a 24 tooth friction gear that slips when a certain amount of torque is put on it to prevent motors from damaging any parts or burning themselves out.

In addition to standard gears, some kits include a rack, a clutch and even worm gears and differential gears. The original differential from 1980 had a 28 tooth bevel gear, designed to be meshed with the 14 tooth bevel gears (replaced by the 12 tooth gears) to give 2:1 reduction. They can also be meshed with the newer double bevel gears. It was replaced in 1994 by a newer design incorporating 16-tooth and 24-tooth gears on opposite sides of the casing. The casing holds three 12 tooth bevel gears inside. In 2008, an updated version of the original differential has been released, optimised for studless construction with a 28 tooth bevel gear on the outside and three 12 tooth gears on the inside. With the release of the 'Top Gear Rally Car' (42109) in 2020, yet another differential was created with a 28 tooth double bevel gear and five 12 tooth gears on the inside so that the differential could be rotated with gears above and next to the differential.

Chain links were also introduced as an additional way of connecting gears. Tension (resulting from the correct number of chain-link parts used), along with the combination of gearwheel-sizes used, is critical to reliable operation. 8-tooth gears are not recommended for this purpose.

Volvo Construction Equipment used a Lego model to develop an electric wheel loader.

Motors

The Lego Technic system has always included a variety of different electric motors. Broadly, these divide into those powered by batteries (held in a connected battery box) or by mains electricity (via a transformer.) Battery-powered is the most common.

The very earliest motors (p/n x469b) were 4.5 volt, and consisted of a modified "Electric Train Motor" (p/n x469) and along with the 4 driven bushes for wheels added an axle hole enabling axles of different lengths to be used. While these were released in kits with Technic parts they were not sold as Technic motors.

The first dedicated Technic motor was a 4.5 volt rounded brick (p/n 6216m) released in 1977 as part of the Expert Builder Power Pack (960-1) and Supplementary Set (870-1), this output via a small protruding axle that would rotate when the motor was powered. The motor was not geared, resulting in high-RPM, low-torque output. Gearboxes and a square casing were available. A 12 volt motor of the same physical dimensions as the 4.5 volt motor was also available in set 880-1. The 12 volt version is visually distinguishable by being black, rather than grey.  The 4.5V and 12V motors were also compatible with the battery boxes and mains transformers used within the Trains series of the 1980s

The 4.5 volt motor was replaced by a similar but square 9 volt motor in 1990, as part of the new generation "Electric System" which dispensed with the pinned plugs and replaced them with regular bricks that incorporated contacts within the stud interfaces. This system gave more reliable contacts over time, as the pinned plugs had a tendency to go slack over time, or for the wires to fracture or come detached.

The 8297 'Motor Set' released in 2006 was capable of extremely high speeds and relatively high torque at the time, up to 1700 rpm and 14 N.cm, and was advertised as an accessory to motorise Technic vehicles during the 9V System 'era'.

Recent motors contain an axle hole enabling axles of different lengths to be used.

Starting with the release of 8275 'Technic Bulldozer', Power Functions (which used infrared to remote control) was introduced as a new electric system and started introducing motors of different sizes, including the M, L, XL and steering (Servo) motor.

The current electric motor systems are Powered Up and Control+, introduced with sets 42099 'X-treme Off-roader' and 42100 'Liebherr R 9800 Excavator'. As a result of the L and XL motors being able to calibrate to become steering motors, there is no dedicated servo motor, as there is no need for one.

Pneumatics

Lego pneumatics is a variety of Lego bricks which use air pressure and specialised components to perform various actions using the principles of pneumatics. The LEGO pneumatics components were first introduced in 1984, and have featured in a variety of LEGO Technic and LEGO Educational (DACTA) products.

Technic Figures
Technic Figures are figures that appeared in Technic sets, appearing sporadically but heavily featured in the CyberSlam/Competition line. They were first introduced in 1986 in the Arctic Action line, and were produced until 2001. They are much larger and have several more joints than the standard minifigure, including bendable elbow and knee-joints. Each figure comes already assembled and is not meant to come apart, but parts can be popped off by pulling too hard. They can connect to both standard Lego System bricks and on Technic parts, and Technic pegs can fit in their hands.
27 different kinds of Technic figures were created, some sets included the same figures but with different accessories and stickers.

Technic Action Figures 
In 1999 Lego Technic Introduced Lego Slizers (known as Throwbots in the US) which were colorful action figures built with Lego Technic parts and branded under Lego Technic. The Slizer sets were released between 1999 and 2000 consisting of 10 main figures Torch, Ski, Turbo, Scuba, Jet, Amazon, Granite, and Electro, Flare, Spark, and 2 Titan figures Millennium and Blaster. Slizers was later replaced by Lego RoboRiders in 2000. RoboRiders were similar in concept to Slizers with Technic Built figures with 6 main figures Swamp, Lava, Frost, Onyx, Dust, Power 4 mini builds and The Boss (Known as Super RoboRider internationally). RoboRiders was later replaced by Bionicle the next year which later spun off into its own line and isn't considered part of Lego Technic.

"Studded" (Beams) versus "Studless" (Liftarms) 

Although liftarms (studless beams) have been present in Technic sets since 1989, the change from primarily studded to primarily studless construction around the year 2000 represented a major paradigm shift and has been quite controversial. Initially liftarms were used primarily as styling parts, or to create smaller sub-assemblies which attached to a studded chassis. With an increasing number of liftarm designs introduced, a tipping point was reached around the year 2000 with models introduced primarily constructed from liftarms instead of traditional beams.

The primary advantage of studless construction is the addition of new construction methods that were previously unavailable. Liftarms are exactly 1 unit width high, in contrast to studded beams, which are a non-integer multiple of one unit. It can be awkward to use studded beams in vertical structures because it is necessary to insert plates between the studded beams in order to get the holes to line up.  Studless beams allow greater flexibility when building in multiple dimensions, while remaining compatible with "classic" studded beams. Some builders also believe that models constructed with studless beams look nicer than their studded counterparts.

However, studless construction also introduces disadvantages. Studless construction is not immediately intuitive, requiring the builder to think five or six steps ahead. While studded construction follows the classic bottom-to-top building pattern, studless construction requires building inside-to-outside. Studless constructions are noted to often be more flexible than an equivalent studded construction. This is due to the amount of flex in the clip-based pins which are used to attach studdless parts together, whereas studs provide a more rigid friction fit.

As of 2005, Lego has begun to re-incorporate studded bricks back into the Technic line, which can be seen in sets such as 8421 Mobile Crane.  However, studded bricks are used primarily as to mount front grills in vehicles while transparent plates are used for lights.

Power Functions

In late 2007, a new motor system was released called Power Functions; it was included within Lego set 8275 Motorized Bulldozer. It comprised a set of motors, two IR receivers, remote control and a battery box, thus resulting in a remote-control model.
 

With these sets it is possible to build or convert manually-operated mechanical movement to motorized using electric motors which are controlled via switches or IR remote control. Lego has already started to design and sell Lego Technic models (sets) which can be easily retrofitted with the Power Functions system or third-party alternatives. For example, models like the 8294 Excavator and 8295 Telescopic Handler are sold like classic Lego Technic models with manual motorization but are designed with free space for the Power Functions components with factory instructions on how to perform the conversion to an electrically operated model.

The Power Functions line-up also includes a Linear Actuator currently not sold separately, but already used in many models like the 8294 Excavator and the 8043 Motorised Excavator.

Powered Up (Control+, Power Functions v2) 
In 2018, Lego announced a new system for motorizing sets, to replace the Power Functions system.  Early in release several names were used including Control+. and Power Functions v2; by 2020 the line was unified under the Lego Theme `Powered Up`.

This new system is controlled via Bluetooth using a smartphone app rather than a physical controller and is not backwards compatible with Power Functions. Components can be bought individually or as packs to either be used with or independently of retail sets. Lego launched two flagship sets to display the new systems functionality: 42100 Liebherr R 9800 and 42099 4x4 X-Treme Off-Roader.

Physically and electrically, the Powered Up system components are compatible with all other lego systems using the same 6-pin plug.  This includes WeDo 2.0, Boost, Spike Prime, Mindstorms v4 as of 2020.  However, software support between the various apps varies.

Theme park attractions
In 2012, a Lego Technic themed land was introduced to Legoland Malaysia Resort. The Technic-themed area includes some of the fastest attractions in the park are Aquazone Wave Racers, The Great LEGO Race, LEGO Academy, LEGO Mindstorms and Technic Twister.

Reception
In 2020, The Lego Group reported that the Lego Technic, Lego Star Wars, Lego Classic, Lego Disney Princess, Lego Harry Potter and Lego Speed Champions, "The strong results are due to our incredible team," and that these themes had helped to push revenue for the first half of 2020 grow 7% to DKK 15.7 billion compared with the same period in 2019.

In March 2022, The Lego Group reported that the Lego City, Lego Technic, Lego Creator Expert, Lego Harry Potter and Lego Star Wars themes had earned for the full year of 2021. Revenue for the year grew 27 percent versus 2020 to DKK 55.3 billion and consumer sales grew 22 percent over the same period, outpacing the toy industry and driving market share growth globally and in largest markets.

On 28 September 2022, The Lego Group reported that the Lego Star Wars, Lego Technic, Lego Icons (formerly Creator Expert), Lego City, Lego Harry Potter and Lego Friends themes had earned for the six months ending 30 June 2022. Revenue for the period grew 17 percent to DKK 27.0 billion compared with the same period in 2021, driven by strong demand. Consumer sales grew 13 percent, significantly ahead of the toy industry, contributing to global market share growth.

In March 2023, The Lego Group reported that the Lego City, Lego Technic, Lego Icons, Lego Harry Potter and Lego Star Wars themes had earned for the full year of 2022. Revenue for the year grew 17 percent to DKK 64.6 billion and consumer sales grew 12 percent in 2022, achieving growth in all major market groups with especially strong performance in the Americas and Western Europe.

Awards and nominations
In 2015, Lego Technic was awarded "Toy of the Year" and also "Educational Toy of the Year" by the Toy Association.

In 2019, Land Rover Defender (set number: 42110) was awarded "DreamToys" in the Trains, Planes and Automobiles category by the Toy Retailers Association.

In 2020, Dom's Dodge Charger (set number: 42111) was awarded "DreamToys" in the Awesome Automobiles category by the Toy Retailers Association.

In September 2022, McLaren Formula 1 Race Car (set number: 42141) was awarded "Toy of the Year" and also "Vehicle of the Year" by the Toy Association.

In 2022, Formula E Porsche 99X Electric (set number: 42137) was awarded "DreamToys" and also "All Out Action" by the Toy Retailers Association.

See also

 Bionicle
 Fischertechnik
 Lego Mindstorms

References

External links 
 

 
1970s toys
1980s toys
Products introduced in 1977